Ist das Ihr Fahrrad Mr O’Brien? (Is this your bicycle, Mr. O'Brien?) is a German biographical radio play about life, works and legacy of Irish modernist writer Brian O'Nolan (5 October 1911 – 1 April 1966).

Plot summary

Irish novelist Brian O’Nolan uses numerous pseudonyms for his literary works. In this radio-drama, these pseudonyms meet and argue with characters from O’Nolan’s novels and narrations. The plot roughly follows O’Nolan’s real life as a student in Nazi-Germany, his return to inter-war Ireland, unemployment and career in the civil service, his declining health, dislike of James Joyce and constant financial troubles.

In the German original the drama was subtitled ‘’Eine Hörspielcollage aus der Welt der Wissenschaft und des Suffs’’ (A radio play patchwork from a world of science and booze), a claim that was brought to life by creative use of sound footage, music, audio-gags, and music by The Dubliners and other celtic folksingers.

Literary sources and setting
The radio play draws from a number of novels, articles, and letters by O’Brien using German translations by Harry Rowohlt and original English texts alike. Rowohlt, an expert on O’Nolan and popular voice artist himself, was not included in the project by the producers.

At Swim-Two-Birds
The Third Policeman
An Béal Bocht
The Hard Life
The Dalkey Archive
’’Cruiskeen Lawn’’

Accordingly, the play’s many settings include some of O’Nolans favorite places, namely Trinity College, Dublin; editorial offices of the Irish Times; a pub in pre-war Cologne; the Irish country-side; rural police stations, roads, barns, and stables.

Characters and performers
Narrator: Hüseyin Cirpici
Flann O'Brien: Martin Engler
3rd Policeman: Udo Thies
Professor De Selby: Ernst August Schepmann
The plain people of Ireland: Peter Penewsky

In the play, a number of writers, historic, literary or public figures, and scientists are mentioned to illustrate O’Nolan’s colorful and over-populated universe, such as Marcel Proust, Oscar Wilde, Graham Greene, James Joyce, Fionn mac Cumhaill, Harry Rowohlt, Homer, Jonathan Swift, George Bernhard Shaw, the Marx Brothers, Brendan Behan, Éamon de Valera, Karl Kraus, Sherlock Holmes, and Erwin Schrödinger.

Awards
Soon after the play was first aired, the first nominations for German radio awards were announced. Later that year it won the prestigious ‘Radio Play of the Month Award’ by the German National Academy of Performing Arts.

 Hörspiel des Monats, Deutsche Akademie der Darstellenden Künste im September 2003.
 Nominated for the 2003 German RadioPlay Awards

Current ownership 
Since most radio shows and plays aired by German national broadcasting companies are not accessible online, current owner and sole distributor is the Saarländischer Rundfunk. The play has been regularly re-broadcast by federal Deutschlandfunk, and regional stations like Bayerischer Rundfunk, Norddeutscher Rundfunk and Suedwestrundfunk.

See also
 False document
 Afterlife
 Catholicism
 Metafiction
 Irish literature

Bibliography

 Levinson, Julie, “Adaptation, Metafiction, Self-Creation,” Genre: Forms of Discourse and Culture. Spring 2007, vol. 40: 1.

External links
 Brian O'Nolan Papers, 1914-1966 at Southern Illinois University Carbondale, Special Collections Research Center
 '100 Myles' & 'The International Flann O'Brien Society'

References

2003 radio dramas
Mockumentaries
Radio programmes based on novels